Henry R. "Hank" Cosby (May 12, 1928 – January 22, 2002) was an American songwriter, arranger, producer and musician who worked for Motown Records from its formative years. Along with Sylvia Moy, Cosby was a key collaborator with Stevie Wonder from 1963–1970. Cosby co-wrote and/or co-produced three No. 1 US hits: Stevie Wonder's "Fingertips" (1963), The Supremes' "Love Child" (1968), and The Miracles' "The Tears of a Clown" (1968).

Life and career 
Cosby was born in Detroit, Michigan in 1928. He served in the U.S. Army during the Korean War, where he played alongside jazz saxophonist Cannonball Adderley in the military band. Upon his return to Detroit, he joined pianist Joe Hunter's jazz band. He played tenor saxophone in jazz clubs, as well as on records for different labels around the city.

When Berry Gordy launched Motown Records in 1959 he recruited the Joe Hunter Band with Cosby, Benny Benjamin, James Jamerson, Larry Veeder, and Mike Terry, forming the basis of the ever-growing group of studio musicians contracted to the company. These studio musicians became known as the Funk Brothers, and as a member of their early line-up Cosby performed on hundreds of Motown recordings in the 1960s, including Martha Reeves & the Vandellas US#2 hit "Dancing in the Street" (1964). As was Motown's policy at the time, none of the studio musicians were credited by name. Cosby also played on John Lee Hooker's 1962 single "Boom Boom", on Vee-Jay Records.

In addition to his saxophone playing, Cosby showed Gordy his talents as an arranger, producer, and songwriter, and became a key collaborator with the young Stevie Wonder.

Through the 1960s Cosby worked with many Motown artists, including production work for The Supremes, The Temptations, Jr. Walker, Edwin Starr, Brenda Holloway, and others. He is best known for co-writing and/or co-producing many of Stevie Wonder's early hits. These include Wonder's first major hit "Fingertips", "My Cherie Amour", "I Was Made to Love Her", "Uptight (Everything's Alright)" and "For Once in My Life". Cosby received a writing credit for Bill Cosby's US#4 hit "Little Ole Man (Uptight, Everything's Alright)" (1967), a revamped version of "Uptight (Everything's Alright)" - but Henry Cosby and Bill Cosby were not related.

Cosby co-wrote and co-produced "The Tears of a Clown" (1968), a US#1 hit for Smokey Robinson & the Miracles.

After leaving Motown when the company moved to Los Angeles in the early 1970s, Cosby worked for a time as a producer with Fantasy Records, including production work for Rance Allen, a gospel-influenced artist from Detroit. His later productions include albums for Martha Reeves, and Blood, Sweat and Tears. In 1977 Cosby wrote and produced the song "Be My Fortune Teller" by 94 East, one of the first recordings by Prince, and Colonel Abrams.

Death 
Cosby died at age 73 on January 22, 2002, at the William Beaumont Hospital in Royal Oak, Michigan, after complications from a cardiac bypass surgery. His name is written on an honorary South Tower Construction beam of the hospital.

Honours
In 2006, Cosby was posthumously inducted into the Songwriters Hall of Fame, alongside Sylvia Moy.

| A Place in the Sun
| Stevie Wonder
| US#9, UK#20
| Ron Miller, Bryan Wells
| Cosby
|-
| 1966
| It Takes Two
| Marvin Gaye & Kim Weston
| US#14, UK#16
| Stevenson, Moy
| Cosby, Stevenson
|-
| 1967
| I Was Made to Love Her
| Stevie Wonder
| US#2, UK#5
| Cosby, Moy, Wonder, Hardaway
| Cosby
|-
| 1967
| I'm Wondering
| Stevie Wonder
| US#12, UK#22
| Cosby, Moy, Wonder
| Cosby
|-
| 1968
| Shoo-Be-Doo-Be-Doo-Da-Day
| Stevie Wonder
| US#9, UK#46
| Cosby, Moy, Wonder
| Cosby
|-
| 1968
| Love Child
| Diana Ross & the Supremes
| US#1, UK#15, CAN#1
| The Clan
| The Clan & Henry Cosby
|-
| 1968
| For Once in My Life
| Stevie Wonder
| US#2, UK#3
| Ron Miller, Orlando Murden
| Cosby
|-
| 1969
| My Cherie Amour
| Stevie Wonder
| US#4, UK#4
| Cosby, Moy, Wonder
| Cosby
|-
| 1969
| No Matter What Sign You Are
| Diana Ross & the Supremes
| US#31, UK#37
| Cosby, Berry Gordy Jr.
| Cosby, Berry Gordy Jr.
|-
| 1970
| The Tears of a Clown
| Smokey Robinson & The Miracles
| US#1, UK#1
| Cosby, Wonder, Robinson
| Cosby, Robinson
|-
| 1970
| Never Had a Dream Come True
| Stevie Wonder
| US#67, UK#6
| Cosby, Moy, Wonder
| Cosby
|-
| 1970
| I Should Be Proud
| Martha & the Vandellas
| US#80
| Cosby, Pam Sawyer, Joe Hinton
| Cosby
|-
| 1971
| C'Est La Même Chanson
| Claude François
| FR#7
| Holland-Dozier-Holland
| Cosby
|-
| 1973
| With a Child's Heart
| Michael Jackson
| US#50
| Cosby, Moy, Vicki Basemore
| Freddie Perren, Fonce Mizell
|-
|}

Albums

References

External links
 Henry Cosby at the Songwriters Hall of Fame
 Henry Cosby biography at AllMusic
 

1928 births
2002 deaths
Musicians from Detroit
Songwriters from Michigan
African-American saxophonists
American male saxophonists
The Funk Brothers members
Rhythm and blues saxophonists
Record producers from Michigan
Motown artists
20th-century American saxophonists
20th-century American male musicians
20th-century African-American musicians
21st-century African-American people
American male songwriters